Chesterton may refer to:

People
Chesterton (surname)
G. K. Chesterton
A. K. Chesterton
Cecil Chesterton
Frank Chesterton (architect)

Places

United Kingdom 
Chesterton, Cambridge
Chesterton railway station
Chesterton, Gloucestershire
Chesterton, Huntingdonshire
Chesterton, Oxfordshire
Chesterton, Shropshire
Chesterton, Staffordshire
Chesterton, Warwickshire
Chesterton Rural District
Chesterton (UK Parliament constituency), Cambridgeshire (1885–1918)
Chesterton (ward), an electoral ward in the Borough of Newcastle-under-Lyme

United States 
Chesterton, Indiana
Chesterton Commercial Historic District
Chestertown, Maryland
Chestertown Historic District (Chestertown, Maryland)
Chestertown, New York
Chestertown Historic District (Chestertown, New York)

Other uses
Chesterton Community College, a secondary school in the UK
Chesterton Academy of Buffalo, a Roman Catholic High School in Buffalo, New York

See also
Chesterton, Cambridgeshire (disambiguation)
United Airlines Chesterton Crash, a 1933 aviation incident in the USA
Chesterton Range National Park